Timofey Aleksandrovich Kulyabin (born 10 October 1984, Izhevsk) is a Russian theater and opera director.

Biography
Kulyabin was one of the most prominent young theatre directors in recent years in Russia. After graduating from the Russian Institute of Theatre Arts (course of Oleg Kudryashov) in 2007 he is successfully working in drama and opera theatres throughout the country and abroad. In his record are already 15 drama and 2 opera productions. Critics mark his ability to switch between large and chamber stages with equally strong and original concepts. All of his productions of the classic dramas and operas create a big resonance in the professional and non-professional theater communities. Kulyabin's Onegin in the Red Torch theatre has been awarded a special prize of the Russian Performing Arts Festival and National Theater Award Golden Mask.

His production of Wagner's Tannhäuser in December 2014 was met by great critical acclaim in Novosibirsk Opera and Ballet Theatre. Some aspect of the production, notably the depiction of Tannhäuser in the Venusberg scene, led to criminal proceedings following a complaint by the Orthodox archbishop of Novosibirsk and Berdsk, Tikhon (Leonid Grigoryevich Yemelyanov). A magistrate court later dismissed those allegations. Stasyulis appealed this decision but subsequently had to withdraw his appeal. Later, the Minister of Culture, Vladimir Medinsky, dismissed the theatre's director, Boris Mezdrich, and appointed Vladimir Kekhman as the new director, who then canceled all further performances.

After the success of his Onegin and #shakespearsonnets in the Theatre of Nations in Moscow, he has been invited to the Bolshoi Theatre to create a new Don Pasquala production in April 2016. Recently Kulyabin took the position of artistic director of the Red Torch theatre in Novosibirsk.

On May 2, 2022, the Bolshoi announced the cancellation of further performances of his adaptation of Don Pasquala. Kulyabin had left Russia due to his criticism of the Russo-Ukrainian War. Kulyabin is now believed to be based in Europe.

Productions
 2006: Down the Nevsky Avenue after Nikolai Gogol's short story "Nevsky Prospekt" (Academic Drama Theatre, Omsk)
 2007: The Queen of Spades after Alexander Pushkin's short story "The Queen of Spades"
 2007: Livejournal (Russian Drama Theatre, Riga)
 2008: Death Defying Acts by Oleg Antonov (Red Torch Theatre, Novosibirsk)
 2008: Jolly Roger by Damir Salimzyanov (Red Torch Theatre, Novosibirsk)
 2008: Macbeth by William Shakespeare (Red Torch Theatre, Novosibirsk)
 2009: Prince Igor by Alexander Borodin (Opera and Ballet Theatre, Novosibirsk)
 2009: Masquerade by Mikhail Lermontov (Red Torch Theatre, Novosibirsk)
 2010: Carmen after Prosper Mérimée's novella Carmen (Volkov Drama Theatre, Yaroslavl)
 2010: No Words (Red Torch Theatre, Novosibirsk)
 2012: Dress Code after Nikolai Gogol's short story "The Overcoat" (Comedian's Shelter Theatre, St. Petersburg)
 2012: Onegin after Alexander Pushkin's novel Eugene Onegin (Red Torch Theatre, Novosibirsk)
 2012: Hedda Gabler by Henrik Ibsen (Red Torch Theatre, Novosibirsk)
 2013: Electra by Euripides (State Theatre of Nations, Moscow)
 2013: Kill after Friedrich Schiller's Intrigue and Love, (Red Torch Theatre, Novosibirsk)
 2014: #shakespearsonnets (State Theatre of Nations, Moscow)
 2014: Tannhäuser by Richard Wagner (Opera and Ballet Theatre, Novosibirsk)
 2015: Three sisters by Anton Chekhov (Red Torch Theatre, Novosibirsk)
 2016: Don Pasquale by Gaetano Donizetti (Bolshoi Theatre, Moscow)
 2017: The Trial by Franz Kafka (Red Torch Theatre, Novosibirsk)
 2017: Rigoletto by Richard Wagner (Opernhaus Wuppertal)
 2022: In the Solitude of Cotton Fields by Bernard-Marie Koltès (Dailes Theatre, Riga)

Awards
 2007    
«The Queen of Spades» after Alexander Pushkin
                                                                                                                                                                
All-Russian Festival «Volga Theatre Seasons» in Samara; award in «Best Director» nomination.

Theatre Festival/Contest «Paradise» organized by Novosibirsk Branch of the Russian Theatre Association; award in «Best Director’s Debut» nomination.
 2008
«A Mortal Trick» by Oleg Antonov

Theatre Festival «Siberian Transit» in Barnaul; an honorary diploma. 
 2009
«Macbeth» by William Shakespeare

Regional Theatre Festival «Paradise» in Novosibirsk; award in «The Best Staging Concept» nomination. 
 2010
Award «A Person of the Year» of culture and art (Novosibirsk)
 2013
«Electra» by Euripides

Theatre award of Moscow daily newspaper « Moskovskij Komsomolets», award in best small scale production nomination

«Onegin» by Alexander Pushkin

National Theatre Festival «Golden Mask», Drama and Puppet Theatre Jury's Special Award
 2014
«Kill» 
«Best production» award of Theatre Festival «New Siberian Transit»
 2015 
Personal Grant of the Government of Russian Federation

«#shakespearsonnets»

Theatre award of Moscow daily newspaper « Moskovskij Komsomolets», award in best small scale production nomination

 2016

«Tannhäuser» by Richard Wagner

«Production of the year» award by magazine «Muzykalnoye obozrenie»

Audience сhoice award «Teatral», award in best musical production nomination

«Three sisters» by Anton Chekhov 

«Production of the year» award by Theatre Critics Association
 2017
«The three sisters» by Anton Chekhov

National Theatre Festival «Golden Mask», Drama and Puppet Theatre Jury's Special Award «Ensemble in the play»

References

External links
 Homepage, 
 Theatre of Nations – official site
 Golden Mask – official site
 Red Torch Theatre – official site
 International Theater Festival Acadameia: Onegin
 RIA Novosti. Preview of Theatre of Nations play Elektra (Photos)
 International Festival-School Territoria: Elektra
 Theatre of Nations: #shakespearesonnets
 John Freedman. "Coupling, Uncoupling Told With Grace and Flair", The Moscow Times (on #shakespearesonnets
 
 
 
 
 
 
 
 
 
 Tannhäuser, gallery
 
 Wiener Festwochen: Three Sisters
 
 
 Sueddeutsche: Groll und Gesten
 Der standard: Drei Schwestern
 Die Presse: Drei Schwestern: Bei Tschechow ist das Dunkel licht genug

1984 births
Living people
People from Izhevsk
Russian activists against the 2022 Russian invasion of Ukraine
Russian opera directors
Russian theatre directors
Novosibirsk Opera and Ballet Theatre